Wehmeier is a surname. Notable people with the surname include:

Gerhard Wehmeier (1935–2009), German Old Testament Scholar
Herm Wehmeier (1927–1973), American baseball player
Kai Wehmeier (born 1968), German-American philosopher and logician

See also
Wehmeyer